Andy Kelly (born June 6, 1968) is a former American football quarterback in the Arena Football League (AFL). He played in the AFL for fifteen seasons for a total of eight different teams. He also played for two seasons for the Rhein Fire of the former World League of American Football.  He played college football at the University of Tennessee from 1988 to 1991.

Early years 
Kelly attended Rhea County High School in Evensville, Tennessee. As a member of the Golden Eagles high school football team, he won Gatorade All-America honors in football as a senior.

College career 
Kelly was a successful collegiate quarterback at the University of Tennessee from 1988–1991 under head coach Johnny Majors. He took over as a starter for Sterling Henton in the 1989 SEC rivalry game against the Alabama Crimson Tide. He became part of Tennessee football lore as part of team that accomplished a 35–34 victory at Notre Dame, later dubbed as "The Miracle at South Bend". The Vols trailed at one point 31–7 before Kelly helped instrument a comeback to beat the Fighting Irish. He set numerous Tennessee and SEC passing records, most of them broken by his later successor at Tennessee, Peyton Manning.

College career statistics

Professional career 
Kelly's predominant professional football career was as an Arena Football League quarterback, playing some of his career with the New Orleans VooDoo, for whom he played for in 2005 and 2007, and which was the last team for which he actively appeared as a player. He previously played for the Charlotte Rage (1993, 1995–96), Nashville Kats (1997–2001), Dallas Desperados (2002), Detroit Fury (2003–2004), Kansas City Brigade (2006), and Utah Blaze (2006).  At the end of the 2006 season, he held several all-time AFL career records, including touchdown passes (767), passing yards (39,948), pass attempts (5,827), pass completions (3,621), and interceptions (155).

On Friday, April 27, 2007, in a 72–57 home loss to their division-mate, the Georgia Force, Kelly joined Aaron Garcia, Clint Dolezel, and Sherdrick Bonner as the only quarterbacks in professional football history to throw for over 800 career touchdowns.

On December 6, 2007, Kelly was named the head coach of the proposed new All American Football League's Tennessee team. However, the league suspended operations March 12, 2008 (permanently, as things later developed, although only a delay was announced at the time), and Kelly signed with the Georgia Force two weeks later on March 26, 2008, but never actually participated in any games as an active player for the Force. Kelly retired as an Arena Football player following the 2008 season and currently serves as a commentator on Tennessee Volunteers football radio broadcasts.

In June 2013, Kelly was nominated for the Arena Football Hall of Fame.

AFL career statistics

Personal life
After his professional football career, Kelly became a full-time insurance agent for State Farm.

References

External links
 Andy Kelly at ArenaFan Online
Just Sports Stats
 Andy Kelly's NFL Europe Stats at The Football Database

1968 births
Living people
American football quarterbacks
Tennessee Volunteers football players
Charlotte Rage players
Rhein Fire players
Nashville Kats players
Dallas Desperados players
Detroit Fury players
New Orleans VooDoo players
Kansas City Brigade players
Utah Blaze players
People from Dayton, Tennessee
Players of American football from Tennessee